Pingcheng District, formerly known as Chengqu  or Cheng District is a district of Datong, Shanxi, China.

Most of the urbanized area of Datong is in this district. In 2020 the district had 807,000 people.

References
www.xzqh.org 

County-level divisions of Shanxi
Datong